The 2019–20 Isle of Man League was the 111th season of the Isle of Man Football League on the Isle of Man.  St Marys were the defending champions.

Promotion and relegation following the 2018–19 season

From the Premier League 
 Relegated to Division 2
 St Johns United
 Braddan

From Division Two 
 Promoted to the Premier League
 Ramsey
 Pulrose United

Premier League

Teams

League table

Division Two

Teams

League table

References 

Isle of Man Football League seasons
Man
Foot
Foot